The 2019 Gainesville mayoral election took place on March 19, 2019 to elect the Mayor of Gainesville.

Incumbent Mayor Lauren Poe was reelected with 61.82% of the popular vote for 2nd term in a 4-way race.

Candidates

Declared

Lauren Poe, incumbent mayor of Gainesville, former city commissioner
Jenn Powell, member of the housing and community development block grant advisory board
Jennifer Reid, legal assistant
Marlon Bruce, leasing agent

Results

References

Gainesville
Gainesville
History of Gainesville, Florida